ABBA is a far-right and Christian right political party in Malta.

History 
The party was founded in 2021 by Ivan Grech Mintoff, the former leader of Alleanza Bidla. The party's registrations was initially refused by the Electoral Commission due to the party's name not being able to be shortened to an acronym. In response to this ABBA filed a judicial protest claiming the commission was discriminating against them. The Electoral Commission later agreed to register the party. ABBA took part in the 2022 Maltese General Elections with candidates in all 13 districts, they received 0.42% of votes. Some ABBA candidates which ran in the election where also members of the far-right Charismatic Pentecostal group River of Love.

Ideology 
ABBA is against COVID restrictions, forming two trade unions in an attempt to fight against them. The party wishes for a national referendum to take place on the Recreational Use of Cannabis, believing the laws introduced that partially legalised recreational cannabis in Malta go against their Christian beliefs.

The party describes itself as pro-life, with founder Ivan Mintoff claiming the Labour and Nationalist parties are "proposing a culture of death" and wish to legalise abortion. The party has filed a police complaint demanding the criminal investigation of 18 Maltese pro-choice activists and organisations. Certain members of the party have espoused various controversial beliefs such as vaccine scepticism, being in favour of gay conversion therapy and anti-semitic conspiracy theories.

Electoral history

House of Representatives

References 

Catholic political parties
Christian democratic parties in Europe
Conservative parties in Malta
Eurosceptic parties in Malta
Political parties established in 2021